Live at the Wiltern is the second live album recorded by Crosby, Pevar and Raymond (CPR).  It was recorded at the Wiltern Theater in Los Angeles in November 1998.

Track listing
"Morrison" (David Crosby, James Raymond) – 5:46
"Little Blind Fish" (Crosby, Jeff Pevar) – 4:40
"One for Every Moment" (James Raymond) – 5:46
"That House" (CPR, Crosby) – 6:25
"Homeward Through the Haze" (Crosby) – 6:43
"At the Edge" (CPR, Crosby) – 4:53
"It's All Coming Back" (Crosby, Pevar) – 4:32
"Rusty and Blue" (Crosby, Pevar) – 9:52
"Delta" (Crosby) – 8:06
CD 2
"Dream for Him" (Crosby) – 6:43
"Old Soldier" (Marc Cohn) – 5:25
"Hero" (Phil Collins, Crosby) Performed by: CPR, Phil Collins, Graham Nash  – 6:09
"Long Time Gone" (Crosby) – 6:28
"Déjà Vu" (Crosby)  – 12:57
"Eight Miles High" (Gene Clark, Crosby, Roger McGuinn)  – 5:29
"Ohio" (Neil Young) – 6:24
"Almost Cut My Hair" (Crosby) Performed by: CPR, Graham Nash  – 7:23

Personnel
Musicians

 David Crosby – guitar, vocals
 Stevie DiStanislao – drums, percussion, vocals
 Andrew Ford – bass
 Jeff Pevar – lead guitar, vocals
 James Raymond – keyboards, piano, Vocals

Guest musicians
 Graham Nash
 Marc Cohn
 Phil Collins

Production
 Marianne Hamann – photography
 J.J. McLeod – engineer
 Tim Owen – photography
 John Gonzales – guitar technician
 Chris Rich – engineer
 Norman Waitt Jr. – liner notes
 Paul Dieter – engineer, producer

References

CPR (band) live albums
1999 live albums
Albums recorded at the Wiltern Theatre